Cristina H. Pacione-Zayas is an American politician and a Democratic member of the Illinois State Senate.

Early life
Pacione-Zayas was born to Hispanic and Italian parents Jose A. Zayas and Theresa M. Pacione in Chicago, Illinois, US. She attended the University of Illinois at Urbana-Champaign for her dual Bachelor of Arts degrees (sociology and Spanish), Ed.M. and PhD in educational policy studies. During her time in school, she co-chaired the Campus Committee on Latina/o Issues.

Career
Upon concluding her education, Pacione-Zayas joined the Latino Policy Forum's Education Department in 2012 and worked as the community schools director at Enlace Chicago. In this role, she managed eight community schools in the Little Village neighborhood and worked as a Culture of Calm Coordinator for the Roberto Clemente Community Academy. On February 27, 2019, Governor Pritzker appointed Pacione-Zayas to the Illinois Board of Education for a term starting February 25, 2019 and ending January 11, 2023 to succeed Lula Mae Ford. Pacione-Zayas was confirmed by the Illinois Senate on May 31, 2019. During her time at Erikson, Pacione-Zayas also established The Early Childhood Leadership Academy for Illinois leaders and directed the Community Data Lab.

When Iris Martinez announced her resignation as a Senator following her election as Clerk of the Circuit Court of Cook County, she announced she would likely choose Pacione-Zayas as her replacement. She said had been "watching and grooming" her for a long time and considered her the person she would "like the committeemen to support." On December 22, 2020, Pacione-Zayas was officially sworn into office to fill the vacated seat, with her term ending in 2022. Although she stepped down from her role as Associate Vice President, Pacione-Zayas continued to provide counsel and subject matter expertise as a consultant and Senior Policy Advisor to Erikson.

As of July 2022, Senator Pacione-Zayas is a member of the following Illinois Senate committees:

 Appropriations - Education Committee (SAPP-SAED)
 Education Committee (SESE)
 Health Committee (SHEA)
 Higher Education Committee (SCHE)
 Human Rights Committee (SHUM)
 Redistricting - Chicago Northwest Committee (SRED-SRNW)
 Revenue Committee (SREV)
 Subcommittee on Children & Family (SHEA-SHCF)
 Subcommittee on Public Health (SHEA-SHPH)

References

Living people
Democratic Party Illinois state senators
Women state legislators in Illinois
21st-century American politicians
21st-century American women politicians
Hispanic and Latino American state legislators in Illinois
Hispanic and Latino American women in politics
University of Illinois College of Education alumni
Year of birth missing (living people)